James McGowan may refer to:

James McGowan (actor) (born 1960), Canadian actor
James McGowan (mathematician), recipient of the Charles Cook Memorial Prize
James McGowan (politician) (1841–1912), New Zealand politician
James M. McGowan (1920–2004), member of the New Jersey General Assembly
Jamie McGowan (disambiguation)
Jimmy McGowan (footballer, born 1919) (1919–?), Scottish international footballer who played for Partick Thistle FC
Jimmy McGowan (footballer, born 1924) (1924–1984), Scottish footballer who played for Southampton FC